This article details statistics relating to the Seattle Seahawks NFL football team, including career, single season and game records.

Offense

Passing
Most pass attempts, career: Russell Wilson, 4,735
Most pass attempts, season: Geno Smith, 572 (2022)
Most pass attempts, rookie season: Rick Mirer, 486 (1993)
Most pass attempts, game: Matt Hasselbeck, 55 (2002)
Most pass completions, career: Russell Wilson, 3,079
Most pass completions, season: Geno Smith, 399 (2022)
Most pass completions, rookie season: Rick Mirer, 274 (1993)
Most pass completions, game: Matt Hasselbeck, 39 (2009)
Highest completion percentage, career (min. 500 attempts): Geno Smith, 69.6 
Highest completion percentage, season (min. 200 attempts): Geno Smith, 69.8 (2022)
Highest completion percentage, rookie season (min. 200 attempts): Russell Wilson, 64.1 (2012)
Highest completion percentage, game (min. 15 attempts): Russell Wilson, 88.6 (2020)
Most passing yards, career: Russell Wilson, 37,059 
Most passing yards, season: Geno Smith, 4,282 (2022) 
Most passing yards, rookie season: Russell Wilson, 3,118 (2012) 
Most passing yards, game: Russell Wilson, 452 (2017) 
Highest yards per attempt, career (min. 500 attempts): Russell Wilson, 7.8
Highest yards per attempt, season (min. 200 attempts): Dave Krieg, 8.8 (1983) 
Highest yards per attempt, rookie season (min. 200 attempts): Russell Wilson, 7.9 (2012) 
Highest yards per attempt, game (min. 15 attempts): Russell Wilson, 14.6 (2018) 
Most passing touchdowns, career: Russell Wilson, 267
Most passing touchdowns, season: Russell Wilson, 40 (2020)
Most passing touchdowns, rookie season: Russell Wilson, 26 (2012) (tied NFL record)
Most passing touchdowns, game: 5 (four players), most recently Russell Wilson (2020)
Most passes intercepted, career: Dave Krieg, 148
Most passes intercepted, season: Jim Zorn, 27 (1976)
Most passes intercepted, rookie season: Jim Zorn, 27 (1976)
Most passes intercepted, game: Jim Zorn, 6 (1976)
Lowest percentage passes had intercepted, career (min. 500 attempts): Russell Wilson and Geno Smith, 1.8
Lowest percentage passes had intercepted, season (min. 200 attempts): Seneca Wallace, 1.2 (2008) 
Lowest percentage passes had intercepted, rookie season (min. 200 attempts): Russell Wilson, 2.5 (2012)
Highest passer rating, career (min. 500 attempts): Russell Wilson, 101.8  
Highest passer rating, season (min. 200 attempts): Russell Wilson, 110.9 (2018)
Highest passer rating, rookie season (min. 200 attempts): Russell Wilson, 100.0 (2012)
Highest passer rating, game (min. 10 attempts): Russell Wilson, 158.3 (2018)
Most games, 300+ passing yards, career: Russell Wilson, 21
Most games, 400+ passing yards, career: Dave Krieg, 4
Most games, 300+ passing yards, season: Russell Wilson, 5 (2020)
Most games, 400+ passing yards, season: Matt Hasselbeck, 2 (2002)
Most games, 1+ passing TD's, career: Russell Wilson, 137
Most games, 2+ passing TD's, career: Russell Wilson, 92
Most games, 3+ passing TD's, career: Russell Wilson, 41
Most games, 4+ passing TD's, career: Russell Wilson, 17
Most games, 5+ passing TD's, career: Russell Wilson, 5
Most games, 1+ passing TD's, season: Dave Krieg, 16 (1984); Russell Wilson, 16 (2015) (tied NFL record)
Most games, 2+ passing TD's, season: Russell Wilson, 13 (2018)
Most games, 3+ passing TD's, season: Russell Wilson, 7 (2018 and 2020)
Most games, 4+ passing TD's, season: Russell Wilson, 5 (2020)
Most games, 5+ passing TD's, season: Russell Wilson, 2 (2015 and 2020)
Most game-winning drives, career: Russell Wilson, 32
Most game-winning drives, season: Dave Krieg, 5 (1990) and Russell Wilson, 5 (2019)
Most fourth quarter comebacks, career: Russell Wilson, 24
Most fourth quarter comebacks, season: Dave Krieg, 4 (1990) and Russell Wilson, 4 (2016, 2019)
Highest %, passing TD's, season: Russell Wilson, 8.4 (35 TD's / 427 Attempts) (2018)
Highest %, passing TD's, rookie season: Russell Wilson, 6.62 (26 TD's / 393 Attempts) (2012)

Receiving

Most receiving touchdowns, career: Steve Largent, 100
Most receiving touchdowns, season: Doug Baldwin, 14 (2015)
Most receiving touchdowns, rookie season: Daryl Turner, 10 (1984)
Most receiving touchdowns, game: Daryl Turner, 4 (1985)
Most pass receptions, career: Steve Largent, 819
Most pass receptions, season: Tyler Lockett, 100 (2020)
Most pass receptions, rookie season: Joey Galloway, 67 (1995)
Most pass receptions, game: Steve Largent, 15 (1987)
Most receiving yards, career: Steve Largent, 13,089
Most receiving yards, season: DK Metcalf, 1,303 (2020)
Most receiving yards, rookie season: Joey Galloway, 1,039 (1995)
Most receiving yards, game: Steve Largent, 261 (1987)
Most games, 100+ receiving yards, career: Steve Largent, 40
Most games, 100+ receiving yards, season: Steve Largent, 6 (1979)
Highest yard average per reception, career (min. 200 attempts): Steve Largent, 16.0
Highest yard average per reception, season (min. 50 attempts): Steve Largent, 18.7 (1979)
Highest yard average per reception, rookie season (min. 50 attempts): Joey Galloway (1995) and DK Metcalf (2019), 15.5
Highest yard average per reception, game (min. 3 attempts): Koren Robinson, 55.3 (2002)

Rushing

Most rushing touchdowns, career: Shaun Alexander, 100
Most rushing touchdowns, season: Shaun Alexander, 27 (2005) (tied 2nd NFL record)
Most rushing touchdowns, rookie season: Curt Warner, 13 (1983)
Most rushing touchdowns, game: 4 (three players), most recently Marshawn Lynch (2014)
Most rushing attempts, career: Shaun Alexander, 2,176
Most rushing attempts, season: Shaun Alexander, 370 (2005)
Most rushing attempts, rookie season: Curt Warner, 335 (1983)
Most rushing attempts, game: Shaun Alexander, 40 (2006)
Most rushing yards, career: Shaun Alexander, 9,429 
Most rushing yards, season: Shaun Alexander, 1,880 (2005)
Most rushing yards, rookie season: Curt Warner, 1,449 (1983)
Most rushing yards, game: Shaun Alexander, 266 (2001)
Most games, 100+ rushing yards, career: Shaun Alexander, 37
Most games, 100+ rushing yards, season: Shaun Alexander, 11 (2005)
Highest yard rushing average, career (min. 400 attempts): Russell Wilson, 5.6
Highest yard rushing average, season (min. 100 attempts): Russell Wilson, 7.2 (2014)
Highest yard rushing average, rookie season (min. 100 attempts): Thomas Rawls, 5.7 (2015)
Highest yard rushing average, game (min. 10 attempts): Marshawn Lynch, 11.6 (2012)
Most rushing touchdowns (quarterback), career: Russell Wilson, 23
Most rushing touchdowns (quarterback), season: Jim Zorn, 6 (1978); Russell Wilson, 6 (2014)
Most rushing touchdowns (quarterback), rookie season: Jim Zorn, 4 (1976) and Russell Wilson, 4 (2012)
Most rushing touchdowns (quarterback), game: Russell Wilson, 3 (2012)
Most rushing yards (quarterback), career: Russell Wilson, 4,689
Most rushing yards (quarterback), season: Russell Wilson, 849 (2014)
Most rushing yards (quarterback), rookie season: Russell Wilson, 489 (2012)
Most rushing yards (quarterback), game: Russell Wilson, 122 (2014)

Combined (rushing and receiving)

Most yards from scrimmage, career: Steve Largent, 13,172
Most yards from scrimmage, season: Shaun Alexander, 1,958 (2005)
Most yards from scrimmage, rookie season: Curt Warner, 1,774 (1983)
Most yards from scrimmage, game: Shaun Alexander, 273 (2001)
Most combined attempts, season: Shaun Alexander, 385 (2005)
Most combined attempts, rookie season: Curt Warner, 379 (1983)
Most total touchdowns, career: Shaun Alexander, 112
Most total touchdowns, season: Shaun Alexander, 28 (2005) 
Most total touchdowns, rookie season: Curt Warner, 14 (1983)
Most total touchdowns, game: Shaun Alexander, 5 (2002)

Defense

Most tackles, career: Bobby Wagner, 1,383
Most tackles, season: Jordyn Brooks, 184 (2021)
Most solo tackles, career: Bobby Wagner, 819
Most solo tackles, rookie season: Bobby Wagner, 87 (2012)
Most tackles, rookie season: Bobby Wagner, 140 (2012)
Most solo tackles, game: David Hawthorne, 15 (2009); Jordyn Brooks, 15 (2021)
 Most assisted tackles, career: Bobby Wagner, 564
Most sacks, career: Jacob Green, 97.5
Most sacks, season: Michael Sinclair, 16.5 (1998)
Most sacks, rookie season: Bruce Irvin, 8.0 (2012) Unofficially: Steve Niehaus, 9.5 (1976) (before sacks were an official stat)
Most sacks, game: 4.0 (four players), most recently Chris Clemons (2012)
Most sacks (defensive back), season: Jamal Adams, 9.5 (2020) (NFL record)
Most tackles for loss, career: Michael Bennett, 69
Most tackles for loss, season: Michael Bennett, 18 (2015)
Most tackles for loss, rookie season: Leroy Hill, 11 (2005)
Most quarterback hits, career: Michael Bennett, 118
Most quarterback hits, season: Michael Bennett, 30 (2015)
Most quarterback hits, rookie season: Bruce Irvin, 19 (2012)
Most interceptions, career: Dave Brown, 50
Most interceptions, season: Kenny Easley, 10 (1984); John Harris, 10 (1981)
Most interceptions, rookie season: Tariq Woolen, 6 (2022)
Most interceptions, game: 3 (five players), most recently Marcus Trufant (2007)
Most interceptions returned for touchdown, career: Dave Brown, 5
Most interceptions returned for touchdown, season: 2 (ten players), most recently Justin Coleman (2017)
Most interceptions returned for touchdown, rookie season: Brandon Browner, 2 (2011)
Most interceptions returned for touchdown, game: Dave Brown, 2 (1984)
Most interception yards returned, career: Dave Brown, 643
Most interception yards returned, season: Brandon Browner, 220 (2011)
Most interception yards returned, rookie season: Brandon Browner, 220 (2011)
Most fumbles, career: Dave Krieg, 108
Most fumbles, season: Dave Krieg, 18 (1989)
Most fumbles, rookie season: Rick Mirer, 13 (1993)
Most forced fumbles, career: Michael Sinclair, 25
Most forced fumbles, season: Dwayne Harper, 10 (1993)
Most forced fumbles, rookie season: Coby Bryant, 4 (2022)
Most fumbles recovered (own and opponent), career: Russell Wilson, 32
Most own fumbles recovered, career: Russell Wilson, 32
Most own fumbles recovered, season: Dave Krieg, 9 (1989) and Jon Kitna, 9 (2000)
Most own fumbles recovered, rookie season: Rick Mirer, 5 (1993)
Most opponents fumbles recovered, career: Jacob Green, 17
Most opponents fumbles recovered, season: Nesby Glasgow, 5 (1989)
Most opponents fumbles recovered, rookie season: Kenny Easley, 4 (1981) and Gregg Johnson, 4 (1981)
Most fumbles return for touchdown, career: Bobby Wagner, 3 and Chad Brown, 3
Most fumbles return for touchdown, season: Bobby Wagner, 2 (2015); Shelton Robinson, 2 (1983); Chad Brown, 2 (1997)
Most passes defended, career: Marcus Trufant, 112
Most passes defended, season: Richard Sherman, 24 (2012)
Most passes defended, rookie season: Brandon Browner, 23 (2011)
Most passes defended, game: Marcus Trufant, 5 (2003)

Special teams

Kicking

Most field goals attempted, career: Norm Johnson, 228
Most field goals attempted, season: Todd Peterson, 40 (1999)
Most field goals attempted, rookie season: John Kasay, 31 (1991)
Most field goals attempted, game: 6 (three players), most recently Olindo Mare (2010)
Most field goals made, career: Norm Johnson, 159
Most field goals made, season: Todd Peterson, 34 (1999)
Most field goals made, rookie season: John Kasay, 25 (1991)
Most field goals made, game: 5 (four players), most recently Stephen Hauschka (2011)
Highest field goal percentage, career (min. 100 attempts): Stephen Hauschka, 88.8
Highest field goal percentage, season (min. 20 attempts): Jason Myers, 100.0 (2020) (tied NFL record)
Highest field goal percentage, rookie season (min. 20 attempts): John Kasay, 80.6 (1991)
Most field goal attempts, 50+ yards, career: Norm Johnson, 26
Most field goals made, 50+ yards, career: Stephen Hauschka, 15
Most field goal attempts, 50+ yards, season: Josh Brown, 8 (2005)
Most field goals made, 50+ yards, season: Stephen Hauschka, 6 (2015) and Jason Myers 6, (2022)
Most field goals made, 60+ yards, career: Jason Myers, 1
Longest field goal made: Jason Myers, 61 yards (2020)
Most consecutive field goals made: Jason Myers, 35 (2019-2020)
Most extra points attempted, career: Norm Johnson, 338
Most extra points attempted, season: Josh Brown, 57 (2005)
Most extra points attempted, rookie season: Josh Brown, 48 (2003)
Most extra points attempted, game: John Leypoldt, 8 (1977)
Most extra points made, career: Norm Johnson, 333
Most extra points made, season: Josh Brown, 56 (2005)
Most extra points made, rookie season: Josh Brown, 48 (2003)
Most extra points made, game: John Leypoldt, 8 (1977)
Highest extra point percentage, career (min. 100 attempts): Todd Peterson, 100.0
Most touchbacks, career: Stephen Hauschka, 257
Most touchbacks, season: Jason Myers, 59 (2019)
Most blocked field goals, career: Joe Nash, 8; Craig Terrill, 8
Most blocked field goals, season: Joe Nash, 3 (1989); Craig Terrill, 3 (2010); Red Bryant, 3 (2011)
Most blocked extra points, career: Mike White, 3
Most blocked extra points, season: Mike White, 2 (1981)
Most blocked kicks (FG's and XP's), career: Joe Nash, 10
Most blocked kicks (FG's and XP's), season: Red Bryant, 4 (2011)

Punting

Most punts, career: Jon Ryan, 770
Most punts, season: Rick Tuten, 108 (1992)
Most punts, rookie season: Ryan Plackemeier, 84 (2006)
Longest punt, season: Jon Ryan, 77 (2011)
Longest punt, rookie season: Ryan Plackemeier, 72 (2006)
Highest punt yard average, career (min. 100 punts): Michael Dickson, 47.6
Highest punt yard average, season (min. 50 punts): Michael Dickson, 49.6 (2020)
Highest punt yard average, rookie season (min. 50 punts): Michael Dickson, 48.2 (2018)
Highest punt net average, season: Michael Dickson, 44.4 (2020)
Most punts inside the 20 yards, career: Jon Ryan, 276
Most punts inside the 20 yards, season: Michael Dickson, 40 (2021)
Most punt touchbacks, career: Jon Ryan, 60
Most punt touchbacks, season: Ryan Plackemeier, 15 (2006)
Most punts had blocked, career: Herman Weaver, 6
Most punts had blocked, season: Herman Weaver, 3 (1979)
Most blocked punts, career:  Kerry Justin, 3

Return

Longest kick return, career: Tyler Lockett, 105 (2015)
Longest kick return, playoffs: Percy Harvin, 87 (2013)
Most combined kick returns, career: Leon Washington, 231
Most combined kick returns, season: Charlie Rogers, 92 (2000)
Most kick return yards, career: Leon Washington, 4,398
Most kick return yards, season: Charlie Rogers, 1,992 (2000)
Most kick return yards, rookie season: Tyler Lockett, 1,231 (2015)
Most kick return yards, game: Leon Washington, 253 (2010)
Most kick returns for touchdown, career: Joey Galloway, 4; Leon Washington, 4
Most kick returns for touchdown, season: Leon Washington, 3 (2010)
Most combined attempts, career: Chris Warren, 1,943
Most kickoff returns, career: Steve Broussard, 165
Most kickoff returns, season: Josh Wilson, 69 (2008)
Most kickoff returns, rookie season: Al Hunter, 36 (1977)
Most kickoff return yards gained, career: Steve Broussard, 3,900
Most kickoff return yards gained, season: Josh Wilson, 1,753 (2008)
Most kickoff return yards gained, rookie season: Tyler Lockett, 852 (2015)
Most kickoff returns yards gained, game: Leon Washington, 253 (2010)
Highest kickoff return average, career (min. 50 kickoff returns): Leon Washington, 26.2
Highest kickoff return average, season (min. 25 kickoff returns): Leon Washington, 29.0 (2012)
Highest kickoff return average, rookie season (min. 25 kickoff returns): Tyler Lockett, 25.8 (2015)
Most kickoff returns for touchdown, career: Leon Washington, 4
Most kickoff returns for touchdown, season: Leon Washington, 3 (2010)
Most kickoff returns for touchdown, game: Leon Washington, 2 (2010)
Most punt returns, career: Nate Burleson, 125
Most punt returns, season: Nate Burleson, 58 (2007)
Most punt returns, rookie season: Will Lewis, 41 (1980)
Most punt return yards gained, career: Nate Burleson, 1,288
Most punt return yards gained, season: Nate Burleson, 658 (2007)
Most punt return yards gained, rookie season: Bobby Joe Edmonds, 419 (1986)
Most punt return yards gained, game: Tyler Lockett, 139 (2015)
Most punt returns for touchdown, career: Joey Galloway, 4
Most punt returns for touchdown, season: Joey Galloway, 2 (1998)
Highest punt return yard average, career (min. 50 punt returns): Charlie Rogers, 12.7
Highest punt return yard average, season (min. 20 punt returns): Charlie Rogers, 14.5 (1999)
Highest punt return yard average, rookie season (min.20 punt returns): Charlie Rogers, 14.5 (1999)
Most punt return fair catches, career: Bobby Engram, 68
Most punt return fair catches, season: Chris Warren, 25 (1992)

Miscellaneous

Most seasons: Joe Nash, 15
Most games played: Joe Nash, 218
Most games started: Steve Largent, 197
Most consecutive games played: Jon Ryan, 159
Most consecutive games started:  Russell Wilson, 149
Most consecutive games started (including playoffs):  Russell Wilson, 165
Most points: Norm Johnson, 810
Most points, season: Shaun Alexander, 168 (2005)
Most points, rookie season: Josh Brown, 114 (2003)
Most points, game: Shaun Alexander, 30 (2002)
Most two-point conversion attempts: Chris Warren, 5
Most two-point conversion made: Lamar Smith, 4
Most two-point conversions made, season: Lamar Smith, 3 (1996)
Most safeties: Rod Stephens, 2
Most safeties, season: Rod Stephens, 2 (1993) (tied NFL record)
Most all-purpose yards, career: Steve Largent, 13,396
Most all-purpose yards, season: Charlie Rogers, 1,992 (2000)
Most all-purpose yards, rookie season: Tyler Lockett, 1,915 (2015)
Most all-purpose yards, game: Shaun Alexander, 273 (2001)
Most Pro Bowls made, career: Walter Jones, 9; Russell Wilson, 9
Most First-team All-Pro selections, career: Bobby Wagner, 6
Most team Pro Bowl selections, season: 7 players (1984, 2005, 2015, 2016, 2017, 2020)
Most wins, season: 13 (2005, 2013)

Coaching

Most wins, career: Pete Carroll, 128
Most wins, season: Mike Holmgren, 13 (2005); Pete Carroll, 13 (2013)
Most playoff wins, career: Pete Carroll, 10
Most road playoff wins, career: Pete Carroll, 3
Most home playoff wins, career: Pete Carroll, 6
Most ties, career: Pete Carroll, 1
Most consecutive winning seasons, career: Pete Carroll, 9 (2012-2020)
Most consecutive playoff appearances, career: Mike Holmgren, 5 (2003-2007); Pete Carroll, 5 (2012-2016)
Most games coached, career: Pete Carroll, 210
Most playoff appearances, career: Pete Carroll, 10
Most division titles, career: Mike Holmgren, 5; Pete Carroll, 5
Most Super Bowl appearances, career: Pete Carroll, 2

Career leaders
All lists are accurate through the 2022 season.

Bold denotes an active player.

Passing leaders

Points leaders

Receiving leaders

Reception leaders

Rushing leaders

Touchdown leaders

Passing TD leaders

Interception leaders

Sack leaders

Tackle leaders

Coaching Wins leaders

See also
 List of National Football League records (individual)

References

External links
Seahawks.com
NFLTeamHistory.com
Rauzulusstreet.com

records
Seattle Seahawks